Kellam may refer to:

Alphonso G. Kellam (1837–1909), American lawyer, judge, and Republican politician
Eman Kellam (born 1997), Nigerian British actor, rapper, television presenter
Murray Kellam, formerly a judge of the Supreme Court of Victoria, Australia
Paul Kellam (born 1965), Professor of Viral Genomics at Imperial College London
Phillip Kellam (born 1956), politician from a well known political family in Virginia Beach
Richard Boykin Kellam (1909–1996), United States district judge in the Eastern District of Virginia
Gregory Kellam Scott (1948–2021), associate justice of the Colorado Supreme Court
Arthur Kellam Tylee OBE (1887–1961), Canadian officer in the Royal Flying Corps during World War I

See also
Lucius J. Kellam Jr. Bridge-Tunnel, a 17.6-mile (28.3-km) bridge–tunnel in the U.S. state of Virginia
Floyd E. Kellam High School, public high school in Virginia Beach, Virginia